John Byron Van Hollen (born February 19, 1966) is an American lawyer and politician who served as Attorney General of Wisconsin from 2007 until 2015. A Republican, he was elected to the office in November 2006 and took office on January 3, 2007, succeeding Democrat Peg Lautenschlager. Van Hollen did not seek reelection in 2014 and left office on January 5, 2015.

Background
Van Hollen's father is John C. Van Hollen, a realtor and former member of the Wisconsin State Assembly. The Van Hollen family lived near Chetek and later moved to Delta. He graduated from St. Olaf College in 1988 with an undergraduate degree in political science and economics. He earned his J.D. degree two years later from the University of Wisconsin Law School.

In 1993, Governor Tommy Thompson appointed Van Hollen District Attorney in Ashland County, where he served for six years. He was subsequently called to service again when Governor Thompson appointed him to serve as Bayfield County District Attorney. He was appointed as the U.S. Attorney for Wisconsin's Western District where he served in that role from 2002 to 2005.

Van Hollen won the Republican nomination for Attorney General in 2006 over then-Waukesha County District Attorney Paul Bucher. In the general election, he narrowly defeated Dane County Executive Kathleen Falk, who had previously bested Lautenschlager in the Democratic primary. Van Hollen was the only Republican in Wisconsin to win a statewide race in 2006. In 2010, he defeated his Democratic opponent by a comfortable margin.

Attorney general
Upon taking office in 2007, Van Hollen took on a backlog of DNA evidence at the Wisconsin State Crime Laboratory. The backlog had grown to thousands of cases. He worked with the Wisconsin Legislature to secure additional resources to solve the backlog and created new efficiencies at the Crime Lab. In 2008, Van Hollen announced changes made by his administration have reduced the backlog by 43% since he took office. His goal was to eliminate the backlog by December 2010.

In April 2010, Van Hollen reached that goal and eliminated the backlog of DNA evidence at the Crime Lab. He secured funding from the federal government to investigate cold case crimes. One of the cold cases led to the arrest of Walter Ellis, a suspected serial killer in Milwaukee.

In September 2008, Van Hollen sued the Wisconsin Government Accountability Board, the state elections agency, to force it check voter registrations for accuracy. Van Hollen said that the motivation for the lawsuit was that potentially illegal votes could sway the election. On October 23, 2008, a Dane County circuit judge dismissed the lawsuit, ruling that Van Hollen did not have standing to bring the lawsuit, because only the United States Attorney General can enforce federal law. Van Hollen appealed the judge's ruling but later dropped it when the Government Accountability Board updated their voter check procedure.

On October 7, 2013, Van Hollen announced he would not seek reelection in 2014 for a third term as attorney general.

Electoral history

References

Living people
1966 births
People from Chetek, Wisconsin
District attorneys in Wisconsin
United States Attorneys for the Western District of Wisconsin
Wisconsin Attorneys General
St. Olaf College alumni
University of Wisconsin Law School alumni
Wisconsin Republicans
People from Waunakee, Wisconsin